People's Committee may refer to

People's Committee (postwar Korea)
People's Committee to Protect Ukraine
People's Committee of Siam
People's Committee (Vietnam)

See also
Popular committees (Yemen)